The 2012 Tampines Rovers FC season involves Tampines Rovers competing in the 2012 S.League. They are also competing in the 2012 AFC Cup after winning the 2011 S.League.

Squad

Sleague

Competitions

S.League

League table

Matches

Singapore Cup

Preliminary round

Quarter-finals

Semi-finals

Final

Singapore League Cup

AFC Cup

References

Tampines Rovers
2012